Bellamont House (sometimes Bellamont Forest) is a Georgian Palladian-style house set amongst 1,000 acres of grounds in Cootehill, County Cavan, Ireland. The house was completed in 1730 for Judge Thomas Coote and likely designed by his nephew, the architect Edward Lovett Pearce.

It is considered to be one of the finest examples of Palladian architecture in Ireland and was originally loosely modelled on the Villa La Rotonda in Vicenza, Italy.

History
The house was constructed for Judge John Coote and passed down through the family in 1800 to an illegitimate son of Charles Coote, 1st Earl of Bellomont. The estate was later gambled away by descendant John Coote in 1874 and acquired by the Dorman-Smith family. Later Eric Dorman-Smith lived in the property after serving for the British army in both world wars before being dishonorably discharged in 1942. Dorman-Smith then changed his name to O'Gowan and became a Republican while allowing the IRA to use the estate as a firing range and safe house during the border campaign. He died in 1969.

In more recent times the property was acquired by a distant descendant of the original Coote family, Australian interior designer John Coote (former husband of Australian MP Andrea Coote) who purchased the House in 1987 for £500,000 Irish pounds. Coote restored the property to its former glory over the following two decades before dying suddenly in 2012 while the property was for sale. The property was finally sold by a Receiver to an American buyer, John Manuel Morehart in 2015 for €2m with part of the grounds now leased to the state-owned forestry company Coillte.

Description

The house is a Palladian style square-plan, four-bay two storey over basement villa set amongst a rolling drumlin landscape. It is faced with red brick with limestone quoins to the ground floor level, and rusticated stone facing to the raised basement level. A protruding Doric entrance portico to the front of the building is also constructed in limestone atop a stone plinth while the broad steps leading up to the villa are sided with ashlar. There are pediments over the ground floor windows with sandstone surrounds and venetian windows to the sides of the property. The property sits on a hill at the highest point in the surrounding area facing mature woodland, pasture, lakes and rivers.

The interior contains marbles busts of various members of the Coote family while the entrance hall is paved with portland stone slabs and contains a coffered elaborate plasterwork ceiling.

The house is approached by a long driveway along Town Lough from the town of Cootehill.

See also
 Dartrey Forest

References

Palladian architecture in Ireland
Houses in the Republic of Ireland
Country houses in Ireland
Manor houses
Buildings and structures in County Cavan
Edward Lovett Pearce buildings